Calvary Baptist Academy may refer to:
 Calvary Baptist Academy (Bloomington, Illinois)
 Calvary Baptist Academy (New Braunfels, Texas)
 Calvary Baptist Academy (Shreveport, Louisiana)